The year 1764 in science and technology involved some significant events.

Astronomy
 Lagrange publishes on the libration of the Moon, and an explanation as to why the same face is always turned to the Earth, a problem which he treats with the aid of virtual work, containing the germ of his idea of generalized equations of motion.

Physics
 Specific and latent heats are described by Joseph Black.

Technology
 The spinning jenny, a multi-spool spinning wheel, is invented by James Hargreaves in Stanhill, near Blackburn, Lancashire, England.

Awards
 Copley Medal: John Canton

Births
 Early – James Smithson, British mineralogist, chemist and benefactor (died 1829)
 April 3 – John Abernethy, English surgeon (died 1831)
 May 4 – Joseph Carpue, English surgeon (died 1846)
 September 17 – John Goodricke, English astronomer (died 1786)
 October – William Symington, Scottish mechanical engineer and steamboat pioneer (died 1831)
 November 10 – Andrés Manuel del Río, Spanish chemist (died 1849)
 Maria Medina Coeli, Italian physician (died 1846)
 Approx. date – Alexander Mackenzie, Scottish explorer (died 1820)

Deaths
 March 17
 William Oliver, English physician (born 1695)
 George Parker, 2nd Earl of Macclesfield, English astronomer (born c. 1696)
 September 2 – Rev. Nathaniel Bliss, English Astronomer Royal (born 1700)
 November 20 – Christian Goldbach, Prussian mathematician (born 1690)

References

 
18th century in science
1760s in science